Luis Nicolás Rivera-Pagán (born December 5, 1942, in San Juan de Puerto Rico, Puerto Rico) is the Henry Winters Luce Professor Emeritus of Ecumenics at Princeton Theological Seminary.

Biography
Luis Nicolás Rivera-Pagán was born in San Juan de Puerto Rico, Puerto Rico, on December 5, 1942.

Rivera-Pagán earned his M. Div. at the Evangelical Seminary of Puerto Rico in 1966, S.T.M. (1967) and M.A. (1968) at Yale University and in 1970 his PhD, also at Yale with the dissertation Unity and Truth: The Unity of God, Man, Jesus Christ, and the Church in Irenaeus, under Jaroslav Pelikan.

Between 1969 and 1970 Rivera-Pagán studied at University of Tübingen, Germany.

Between years 1970 and 2003 Rivera-Pagán was Professor of Systematic theology at the Evangelical Seminary of Puerto Rico and Professor of Humanities at the University of Puerto Rico.

Between 1999 and 2000 Rivera-Pagán was the John Alexander Mackay Visiting professor on World Christianity at Princeton Theological Seminary. This position, held during his sabbatical year lead to his appointment in 2003 to the faculty of Princeton Theological Seminary, as the Henry Winters Luce Professor of Ecumenics and Mission. In June 2007 he retired with the status of Professor-emeritus.

Presently Rivera-Pagán holds the chair of Humanities at the Faculty of General Studies of the University of Puerto Rico.

Bibliography
Rivera-Pagán is a prolific author, who wrote, co-authored, edited and co-edited dozens of books, journal issues, chapters, articles, and reviews in books and journals. Below is a complete list of books, edited books and journal issues, and a selection of book chapters and journal articles.

Books

Selected book chapters and journal articles

 John Alexander Makay Visiting professor in World Christianity lecture at Princeton Theological Seminary.
 Inaugural address at Princeton Theological Seminary.

References

1942 births
People from San Juan, Puerto Rico
Living people
Yale Divinity School alumni
Princeton Theological Seminary faculty
University of Puerto Rico faculty
World Christianity scholars